Below is the list of asteroid close approaches to Earth in 2016.

Timeline of known close approaches less than one Lunar distance from Earth in 2016 
A list of known near-Earth asteroid close approaches less than 1 lunar distance from Earth in 2016.

This year, 6 (possibly 7) asteroids traveled nearer than this, most notably , which approached a mere 1.25 Earth radii (8000 km) from the surface.

While most asteroids on this list are confirmed, well-observed unconfirmed objects with a 50% or greater chance of passing within 1 LD of the Earth are included as well.

This list does not include any of the 32 objects that collided with earth in 2016, none of which were discovered in advance, but were recorded by sensors designed to detect detonation of nuclear devices (of the 32 objects detected 4 had an impact energy greater than that of a 1 kiloton device).

Warning Times by Size 
This sub-section visualizes the warning times of the close approaches listed in the above table, depending on the size of the asteroid. The sizes of the charts show the relative sizes of the asteroids to scale. For comparison, the approximate size of a person is also shown. This is based the absolute magnitude of each asteroid, an approximate measure of size based on brightness.

Abs Magnitude 30 and greater
 (size of a person for comparison)

Abs Magnitude 29-30

Absolute Magnitude 28-29

Absolute Magnitude 27-28

Absolute Magnitude 26-27

Absolute Magnitude 25-26
 
Absolute Magnitude less than 25 (largest)

Notes

Timeline of close approaches less than one Lunar distance from the Moon in 2016 
The number of asteroids listed here are significantly less than those of asteroids that approach Earth for several reasons. Asteroids that approach Earth not only move faster, but are brighter and are easier to detect with modern surveys because:
 Asteroids that come closer to Earth are a higher priority to confirm, and only confirmed asteroids are listed with a lunocentric approach distance.
 Those that closely approach the Moon are frequently lost in its glare, making them harder to confirm. They are easier to discover during the new Moon, when the Moon is too close to the Sun to detect asteroids while they are near the Moon. 

These factors severely limit the amount of Moon-approaching asteroids, to a level many times lower than the asteroids detected passing as close to Earth.

Notes

Additional examples
An example list of near-Earth asteroids that passed more than 1 lunar distance (384,400 km or 0.00256 AU) from Earth in 2016.
 (~102 meters in diameter) passed 4.92 Lunar distances (1.9 million km) from Earth on 15 January 2016.
XBBE860 (~8 meters in diameter) passed 1.13 lunar distances (435,000 km) from Earth on 1 February 2016.
P10tc2W (~10 meters in diameter) passed 1.02 lunar distances (391,000 km) from Earth on 6 March 2016
 (~30 meters in diameter) may have passed as close as 0.07 lunar distances (30,000 km) from Earth around 5–6 March 2016, but the best fitting orbital solution suggests that it passed roughly 11 lunar distances (4 million km) from Earth around 8 March 2016.  has not been observed since 2013 and was not recovered during the 2016 passage.
252P/LINEAR (~900 meters in diameter) passed 13.9 lunar distances (5.3 million km) from Earth on 21 March 2016
Comet P/2016 BA14 (~1000 meters in diameter) passed 9.2 lunar distances (3.5 million km) from Earth on 22 March 2016.
 (~6 meters in diameter) has a minimum estimated approach on May 8, 2016 of 0.82 lunar distances (315,000 km) from Earth. However the best fit calculates an approach of 7.6 lunar distances (2.9 million km) from Earth.
 (~200 meters in diameter) passed 6.2 lunar distances (2.4 million km) from Earth on May 24, 2016.
 (~23 meters in diameter) passed 27.98 lunar distances (10.7 million km) from Earth on March 26, 2016
2016 PQ (~30 meters in diameter) passed 9.80 lunar distances (3.8 million km) from Earth on August 7, 2016.
 (~8 meters in diameter) passed between 1.0012 and 1.0029 lunar distances (385,000 km) from Earth on September 26, 2016.
 (~11 meters in diameter) passed 1.033 lunar distances (397,000 km) from Earth on October 24, 2016
 (~108 meters in diameter) passed 4.6 Lunar distances (1.75 million km) from Earth on 30 December 2016

Other objects 
XF38FAC (Satellite 2015-007B) with an observation arc of only 17 minutes was estimated to have a chance of impacting Earth at 16:51 on 20 March 2016, but turned out to be the SpaceX Falcon 9 second stage that sent Deep Space Climate Observatory out to L1.

See also 
List of asteroid close approaches to Earth
List of asteroid close approaches to Earth in 2015
List of asteroid close approaches to Earth in 2017

References 

close approaches to Earth in 2016
Near-Earth asteroids